The fourth and final season of Lois & Clark: The New Adventures of Superman originally aired between September 22, 1996 and June 14, 1997, beginning with "Lord of the Flys".

The series loosely follows the comic philosophy of writer John Byrne, with Clark Kent as the true personality, and Superman as a secondary disguise. As the show's title suggests, it focuses as much on the relationship between Clark Kent and Lois Lane on the adventures of Clark's alter-ego. The central characters in season 4 are Dean Cain as Clark Kent/Superman, Teri Hatcher as Lois Lane, Lane Smith as Perry White, Eddie Jones as Jonathan Kent, K Callan as Martha Kent, Justin Whalin as Jimmy Olsen.

The fourth and final season had several two-part episodes. It began with the resolution of a cliffhanger involving a previously unknown colony of Kryptonians. A villainous conqueror from New Krypton, Lord Nor, takes over Clark's hometown of Smallville. After the conclusion of this story, Lois and Clark finally wed in the third episode of the season entitled "Swear To God, This Time We're Not Kidding". The same week of the airing of this episode, DC Comics released Superman: The Wedding Album, featuring the long-awaited marriage of Lois and Clark/Superman, written and penciled by many of the writers and artists involved with Superman since the 1986 revamp, including some legends from the Silver Age, and an unpublished work of the late Curt Swan.

The series ended on a cliffhanger in which Lois and Clark find an infant in Clark's old bassinet, along with a note that claimed the child belonged to them. This mystery was never resolved in the TV series, but Brad Buckner (executive producer and writer for seasons three and four) later revealed in an interview that the infant was in fact Kryptonian royalty hidden with Lois and Clark so that they could protect him from assassins.

Earlier in the fourth season, ABC had announced and promised an additional fifth year of the show, so the show's producers and writers were caught unprepared when ABC later changed its mind and decided that no new episodes would be produced. The series had weakened in its Sunday 8:00 timeslot and had been shifted to 7:00 in January, and finally a last-ditch move to Saturdays in the spring. The ratings dropped even further, and the show finished its last season at 104th place. ABC made up for its commitment with Warner Bros. by ordering thirteen episodes of a Debra Messing drama called Prey.

Episodes

See also 

 List of Lois & Clark: The New Adventures of Superman episodes

References

External links 
 Season 4 at the Internet Movie Database.

1996 American television seasons
1997 American television seasons
Lois & Clark: The New Adventures of Superman seasons